The Hellenic Operational Research Society (HELORS) is the official non-profit society for the scientific field of Operations Research in Greece. The society is a member of the European umbrella organization, the Association of European Operational Research Societies, and of the International Federation of Operational Research Societies.

History 

HELORS was created in 1963, aiming to promote the tools and methodologies of Operational Research (OR) and Scientific Management, for the benefit of the Greek economy and society. In 1984 the Macedonia-Thrace annex of HELORS was founded, aiming primarily at the growth of OR in the greater area of Balkans and at the amelioration of the structures and communication of the HELORS members of northern Greece.
HELORS corporate headquarters are located in Athens, where administrative council sits, in privately owned offices. Pioneering Hellenic OR Researchers in one of the first meetings of HELORS in the 60's are displayed on the photo.

Governance 

HELORS is managed by a board of 11 members. The Board consists of the president, two vice presidents, a general secretary, a special secretary, a cashier and five members of the General Council. Board members are elected by the members of HELORS every two years, in the premises of the society in Athens.
The current president is Nikolaos Matsatsinis.
Since HELORS establishment, its Presidents have been the following:
 1963-1974: General Radamathis Spanogiannakis, Founder of HELORS
 1974-1976: Professor Dimitris Xirokostas, National Technical University
 1976-1978: Professor Ioannis Pappas, National Technical University
 1979-1980: Professor Dimitris Xirokostas, National Technical University
 1981-1984: Professor Dimitris Blesios, University of Piraeus
 1985-1988: Professor Dimitris Papoulias, Kapodistrian University of Athens
 1989-1990: Professor Konstantinos Papis, University of Piraeus
 1991-1994: Konstantinos Vasiliadis, Executive Manager 
 1995-1996: Spiros Pashentis, Executive Manager
 1997-1998: Professor Konstantinos Papis, University of Piraeus
 1999-2004: Professor Ioannis Siskos, University of Piraeus
 2005-2008: Professor Dionisios Giannakopoulos, Technical Institute of Piraeus
 2009-2012: Professor Nikolaos Matsatsinis, Technical University of Crete
 2013-2016: Professor John Psarras, National Technical University of Athens
 2017-2020: Professor Nikolaos Matsatsinis, Technical University of Crete

Membership 

Currently (2019), the society has about 200 members - individuals and institutions from academia, industry and administration.

Working Groups 

For better organization and efficiency, the HELORS operates in working groups. Currently the following working groups have been approved and operate specialized in different topics: 
 Multicriteria Decision Analysis (Group Coordinators: Prof. Yannis Siskos & Prof. Nikolaos Matsatsinis), and 
 Operational Research in Health (Group coordinator: Prof. Aris Sissouras). 
The Multicriteria Decision Analysis group has already organized thirteen (13) meetings in Multicriteria Analysis and one (1) seminar on Multiple Criteria Decision Aid. 
In the near future, more working groups are expected to approve and operate.

Publications 

HELORS issues the scientific journal Operational Research: An International Journal – ORIJ. ORIJ publishes high quality scientific papers that contribute significantly to the fields of Operational Research and Management Science (OR/MS). As of the beginning of 2008, ORIJ is published by Springer. Operational Research - An International Journal (ORIJ) Impact Factor for 2017 is 1.816 (Thomson Reuters Journal Citation Reports).

Awards 

The 'National Award and Operational Research Gold Medal' is awarded annually by HELORS to distinguished Greek researchers with outstanding contribution to the Operational Research field.
To date, the following awards have been awarded:
 1999   General Radamathis Spanogiannakis, Hellas
 2000  Professor Dimitris Bertsekas, Massachusetts Institute of Technology (MIT), USA
 2001   Professor Panagiotis Pardalos, University of Florida, USA
 2002   Professor Spyros Makridakis, INSEAD, France
 2003   Professor Dimitris Xirokostas, National Technical University, Hellas
 2004   Professor Dimitris Bertsimas, Massachusetts Institute of Technology (MIT), USA.
 2005   Professor Yannis Siskos, University of Piraeus, Hellas
 2006  Professor Biron Papathanasiou, Aristotle University of Thessaloniki, Hellas
 2007   Professor Vangelis Paschos, University Paris-Dauphine, France.
 2008   Professor Aristidis Sisouras, University of Patras, Hellas.
 2009   Professor Konstantinos Zopounidis, Technical University of Crete, Hellas.
 2012   Professor Kostas Paparizos, Macedonian University, Hellas.
 2013   Professor Christodoulos Floudas, Princeton University, USA
 2014   Professor Kostas Tsouros, Aristotle University of Thessaloniki, Hellas
 2015   Professor Emmanouil Samouilidis, National Technical University, Hellas
 2016   Professor Nikolaos Sahinidis, Carnegie Mellon University, USA
 2017   Professor John Tsitsiklis, Massachusetts Institute of Technology, USA.
 2018   Professor Markos Papageorgiou, Technical University of Crete, Hellas.

Conferences 

HELORS has organized 30 National Conferences, with more than 6000 participants and announcements, as well as 11th International and 4th Balkan Conferences. The MCDA Working Group has additionally organized 13th meetings and 1 seminar on Multiple Criteria Decision Aid.

Among those conferences was the: 
 12th International Conference on Operational Research of the International Federation of OR Societies (IFORS), which was held in Athens 25–29 June 1990. It was then recognized as the best, in terms of quality and content of IFORS conferences, and had brought together 700 scientists from all around the globe. 
 The 20th European Operational Research Societies (EURO) conference: "OR and the Management of Electronic Services" in Rhodes during 4–7 July 2004.
HELORS has undertaken to organize the next EURO conference:
 31st European Conference on Operational Research (EURO 2021), 11 – 14 July 2021, Athens.

1st Meeting of the Hellenic Working Group on Multiple Criteria Decision Aiding (Chania 2003)

References

External links 
 

Operations research societies
Research institutes in Greece